A by-election was held for the New South Wales Legislative Assembly electorate of Blayney on 3 January 1913, following the resignation of George Beeby. Beeby was Minister for Labour and Industry and Secretary for Lands in the McGowen ministry however he resigned from the ministry, parliament and party in protest at the power of the extra-parliamentary Labor Party executive.

Dates

Result

A second ballot was necessary because no candidate had won an absolute majority.

George Beeby resigned from the ministry, parliament and party in protest at the power of the extra-parliamentary Labor Party executive.

See also
Electoral results for the district of Blayney
List of New South Wales state by-elections

Notes

References

1913 elections in Australia
New South Wales state by-elections
1910s in New South Wales
January 1913 events